Coscinia cribraria, the speckled footman, is a moth of the family Erebidae. The species was first described by Carl Linnaeus in his 1758 10th edition of Systema Naturae. It is found in Europe except the most northern parts; also in north-western Africa, Kazakhstan, Siberia, Mongolia, north-western and north-eastern China.

The wingspan is 30–35 mm. The moth flies from July to August depending on the location.

The larvae feed on various herbaceous plants, including Festuca, Calluna vulgaris and Plantago lanceolata.

External links

Moths and Butterflies of Europe and North Africa
Fauna Europaea
Lepiforum e.V.

Callimorphina
Moths described in 1758
Moths of Europe
Moths of Asia
Taxa named by Carl Linnaeus